Arthur Ferrier (1891 – 27 May 1973) was a Scottish artist, illustrator and cartoonist.

Ferrier was born and started work in Glasgow, Scotland as an analytical chemist.  He freelanced as a cartoonist for the Daily Record there. He moved to London and drew joke cartoons for a number of weekly magazines, including Punch, The Humorist and London Opinion.

In 1930, he produced a weekly strip glamour cartoon called "Film Fanny". A London paper, the Sunday Pictorial, published his glamour drawing under the title "Our Dumb Blonde", which ran from 1939 to 1946.  A comic strip called "Spotlight on Sally" in the Pictorial was followed by another called "Eve".

In 1941 Arthur Ferrier teamed-up with the well-known glamour photographer Horace Roye to produce the book Arthur Ferrier's Lovelies Brought to Life by Roye. It was published by Chapman and Hall.

In addition to his printed work, Ferrier also painted during World War I.  Some of this work is in the collection of the Imperial War Museum in London.  He also produced a set of drawings used on sets of china ware from the Royal Albert China Collections.

References

External links
Arthur Ferrier – Comic creator (Lambiek comic shop)
Arthur Ferrier (John Noott Galleries)

20th-century Scottish painters
Scottish male painters
Scottish editorial cartoonists
Scottish illustrators
Artists from Glasgow
1973 deaths
1891 births
20th-century Scottish male artists